King Crin (Italian: La storia del Re Crin) is an Italian fairy tale collected by Antonio Arietti. Italian author Italo Calvino reworked the tale as King Crin in his work Italian Folktales.

The tale is related to the international cycle of the Animal as Bridegroom or The Search for the Lost Husband, wherein a human maiden marries a prince cursed to be an animal, loses him and has to search for him. According to scholars, the pig or swine as the form of the cursed husband is very popular in Italy.

Sources 
Calvino sourced the tale from Monteu da Po, Piedmont.

Summary 

A king has a pig for a son, named King Crin. One day, he oinks that he wants a human wife, one of the baker's daughters. The baker's elder daughter is convinced of marrying the pig, and they celebrate the wedding. The pig prince, however, wanders through town to play in the mud, and returns to the palace to meet his wife in their wedding chambers. He jumps on the bed to caress her, and ends up dirtying her dress. The girl tries to shoo him away in disgust, and the pig threatens her. The next morning, she is found dead.

King Crin decides to marry again, this time to the baker's middle daughter. Again, befitting his porcine appearance, he dirties himself in mudpits around the city and goes back to his wife in their chambers. Once again, he dirties her dress, she complains about it, and he kills her for it.

Finally, the baker's youngest daughter marries the pig, treating him with kindness despite the pig's behaviour, and survives the night. One night, however, she lights a taper to better see her husband, and finds on her bedside a handsome youth instead of the pig. She then accidentally drops the taper on his body and he wakes up. King Crin then admonishes his wife, saying she will only find him after filling seven jars with tears, and wearing out seven pairs of iron shoes, seven iron hats and seven iron mantles, then vanishes.

The girl decides to go after her husband: after she sheds tears to fill the jars, she commissions the iron garments to begin her quest. She passes by the house of the Wind and its mother, and is given a chestnut. She next goes to the house of the Lightning and its mother, and is given a walnut, and lastly to the house of the Thunder and its mother, and gains a hazelnut.

At the end of her wanderings, she reaches a city where the now human King Crin is set to be married to the local princess. Following the advice of the mothers of the elements, she cracks open the nuts to find valuable items inside: the chestnut reveals gems and diamonds, the walnut produces gowns and silks; and the hazelnut yields horses and carriages. For three days, the girl bribes the local princess with the exquisite gifts so she can spend a night with her husband. She gives the gems and diamonds to the princess, who gives King Crin a sleeping potion and he cannot react to his true wife's tearful pleas. The situation repeats on the second night. On the third night, King Crin pretends to be asleep, and secretly listens to his wife's pleas. He wakes up and recognizes her, and they both go home.

Analysis

Tale type 
The tale is classified in the international Aarne-Thompson-Uther Index as tale type ATU 425A, "The Animal (Monster) as Bridegroom": the princess burns the husband's animal skin and she must seek him out, even paying a visit to the Sun, the Moon and the Wind and gaining their help. The heroine is given marvellous objects on the way to her husband by the personifications of the elements, or by her helpers, and she uses them to bribe the false bride for a night with him. Only on the third night the heroine manages to talk to her husband and he recognizes her.

Motifs 
According to Hans-Jörg Uther, the main feature of tale type ATU 425A is "bribing the false bride for three nights with the husband". In fact, when he developed his revision of Aarne-Thompson's system, Uther remarked that an "essential" trait of the tale type ATU 425A was the "wife's quest and gifts" and "nights bought".

The animal husband 
Polish philologist Mark Lidzbarski noted that the pig prince usually appears in Romance language tales, while the hedgehog as the animal husband occurs in Germanic and Slavic tales.

Calvino noted that "the folktale about the swine king is one of the most widespread in Italy". A similar opinion was given by Letterio di Francia: he concluded that in many Italian variants the prince is either transformed into a serpent or is an enchanted pig. Likewise, Swedish scholar  stated that the swine as the form of the enchanted husband is "traditional" in Italy.

Variants

Italy 
In a Sicilian variant collected by Laura Gonzenbach, Vom Re Porco ("About King Pig"), a queen wishes for a son, even if it is a pig, and thus one is born. Years later, the pig son wants to marry. He marries three times: the first two times, after the marriage, he plays in the mud and tries to climb onto the bride's lap, but she rejects him. On the wedding night, the pig prince takes off his skin, becomes a handsome human prince and kills his wife. With the third bride, she accepts the dirty bridegroom and her life is spared on her wedding night. She also learns her husband is an enchanted prince and must not reveal the truth to anyone. However, she tells the queen and her pig husband disappears. The princess, then, is forced to seek him out in a distant kingdom. On her journey, she meets three old hermits, who give her a hazelnut, a nut and an almond. Finally, the princess reaches the foreign queen's realm, and cracks open the hermits' presents: first, she finds a golden hen with golden chicks; next, she finds a golden toy schoolgirl and pupils; lastly, a golden eagle. The girl uses the golden objects to buy three nights in her husband's bed.

In a Venetian variant, Der Prinz mit der Schweinshaut ("The Prince with the Pigskin"), an evil sorceress curses a neighbouring king so that his wife gives birth to "a prince wearing a pigskin". He marries two princesses who insult him when he dries off his body with their bridal dress and he kills them for it. He marries the third princess, who does not seen to mind his drying off his body with her dress. This pleases the pig prince, who lets her see his true form, in exchange for her keeping the secret. When they attend a tournament the next day, the Queen Mother notices the handsome man by her daughter-in-law's side and thinks it is not her son. Soon, the queen confronts the princess, who is forced to reveal the truth to her mother-in-law. The queen burns the pigskin and the prince disappears. The princess goes on a quest to rescue him, by meeting the Stella d'Oro ("Abendstern"), the Sun and the Wind. She gains from each a hazelnut, a nut and an almond. The princess hires herself as a goose herd for a second spouse, and cracks opens the nuts: she finds a dress "the colour of the Stella d'Oro" in the first; a dress the colour of the sun in the second, and "an even more beautiful dress" in the third. The princess uses the three dresses to bribe for three nights with her husband.

Author  colected a tale from Firenze with the title Il Re Porco ("The Pig King"). In this tale, a pregnant queen walks to a terrace for a bit of fresh air, when she insults a passing beggar woman by calling her a swine. In return, the woman curses the queen to give birth to a pig. A prince is born, in the shape of a pig, and the queen realizes it was the beggar woman's fault. The pig prince grows up and, when he is older, wants to be married. One day, he sees a mugolio'''s three daugthers, and falls in love with one of them. The mugolio is told of the prince's wishes and asks his daughter which will want to marry the pig: the youngest and the middle daughter refuse to do so, while the elder agrees. The pig and the girl marry in a ceremony, and, in their bedchambers, the prince takes off his pigskin to become a handsome youth. His wife is surprised at this turn of events, but the youth asks her not to tell his mother, since his porcine appearance is due to her arrogance during the pregnancy. The girl promises the youth not to tell anyone, but, the next morning, the queen pesters her for details and she blabs about it. The same night, the pig prince chastises his wife for betraying his secret, and kills her. This happens again with the second sister. The pig marries the third sister and shows her his true form, asking her not to tell his mother. The next morning, the third sister tries to keep quiet about her husband's secret, but she tells the queen and asks her not to tell a soul about it. The same night, the pig youth admonishes his wife, but, instead of killing her, says she will only find him after she wears down seven iron canes, seven iron dresses and seven pairs of iron shoes, and fill seven jugs with tears. He kisses his mother goodbye and departs. The girl goes after him, and meets three old woman on the road, each giving her a gift (a nut, a hazelnut, and an almond) and some advice: cracking open the nuts and bribing her husband's second bride, a queen, with its objects for a night with the human pig prince. The girl finally wears out the seven iron garments and reaches a palace. She cracks open the nuts and finds three "galanterie" which she uses to bribe for three nights with her husband. She fails on the first two nights, but manages it on the third, by recounting her journey to make him remember (in her verses, she calls herself "Son Ginevra bella"). The pig prince wakes up, since he put a sleeping potion in his second bride's drink, and orders his servants to bring all his riches to back to his mother's castle. His orders are carried out and the pig prince returns to his mother's palace with his wife in tow. Back to the second bride, she wakes up and notices that the castle is empty from top to bottom, releases a loud scream and falls dead.

Italian folklorist Giuseppe Pitrè collected a tale from Pratovecchio, Tuscany, with the title Il re porco. In this tale, a king and queen have a son with the face of a pig. When he is 18 years old, he wants to get married, but no maiden wishes to be his bride. One day, he finds a suitable bride for him: the elder daughter of a calzolaio. The pig prince marries the elder daughter and, during the celebration, he sploshes in the mud and dirties his bride's dress. The girl complains and is killed for it on their wedding night. The same events happen to the middle daughter of the calzolaio. Finally, the man's youngest daughter agrees to marry the pig prince, and she treats the porcine bridegroom with kindness. In return, he spares her life. They live together, and the pig prince asks his wife not to tell anyone that he becomes a handsome youth at night. Despite promising so, the girl tells the king the truth about the prince. That same night, the prince chastises his wife, and says she will never find him unless she fills seven jars with tears and wears down seven pairs of iron shoes, seven dresses and seven hats, and departs. The girl cries for the loss of her husband, then begins her journey. She passes by the house of the Vento di sotto and his wife. The Vento di sotto cannot help her, so he gives her a hazelnut and directs her to his cousin, the wind Liofante (which Pitrè understood to mean Levante, that is, from the East). The girl next reaches the house of Liofante and his wife, who also cannot help him, so she is directed to his brother, the Ponente ('Sunset Wind') and is given an almond. Lastly, she arrives at the house of Ponente and his wife, who tell her the prince has married another wife, a queen, and gives her a nut. The Ponente also takes her to the city where the queen lives. The girl cracks open the nuts and finds a golden trousseau (corredo da bambini) in the first, then a corredo for older children, and finally a corredo'' for a pregnant woman. She uses the three objects to bribe for three nights in her husband's bed, failing on the first two and waking him up on the third.

See also 
 The Pig King
 The Enchanted Pig

References 

Italian fairy tales
Fictional kings
Fictional pigs
Fiction about shapeshifting
Pigs in literature
ATU 400-459